(born 1950) is a Japanese climatologist at the Japan Advanced Institute of Science and Technology. She is primarily known for her work on climate change and climate policy. She is a lead Japanese author on the 4th and 5th IPCC assessment reports.

Career
Kainuma received her B.S., M.S., and Ph.D. degrees in applied mathematics and physics from Kyoto University, Japan. Since 1977, she has worked on air pollution and climate change at the National Institute for Environmental Studies (NIES), where she is currently the Chief of Climate Policy Assessment Research Section. She is a lead author on the Fourth and Fifth Assessment Report of the United Nations Intergovernmental Panel on Climate Change (IPCC).

Her projects include the Asia-Pacific Integrated Model (AIM) and the Integrated Environmental Assessment sub-project of Asia-Pacific Environmental Innovation Project (APEIS).

Main publications 
 R. H. Moss u. a.: The next generation of scenarios for climate change research and assessment. In: Nature. Band 463, Nr. 7282, 2010, S. 747, doi:10.1038/nature08823
 M. Kainuma, Y. Matsuoka und T. Morita (Hrsg.): Climate policy assessment: Asia-Pacific integrated modeling. Springer Science & Business Media, 2011, 
 D. P. Van Vuuren u. a.: The representative concentration pathways: an overview. In: Climatic Change. Band 109, Nr. 1–2, 2011, S. 5, doi:10.1007/s10584-011-0148-z

References

Japanese climatologists
Japanese women scientists
1950 births
Living people
Kyoto University alumni